{{Infobox school
 | name                    = Thornton Fractional SouthHigh School
 | logo_size               = 220
 | image                   = 
 | motto                   = 
 | streetaddress           = 18500 Burnham Avenue
 | city                    = Lansing
 | state                   = Illinois
 | zipcode                 = 60438
 | country                 = United States
 | coordinates             = 
 | schooltype              = Public Secondary
 | established             = 
 | founded                 = 
 | opened                  = 1957
 | closed                  = 
 | district                = Thornton Fractional Twp. HS 215
 | superintendent          = Dr. Sophia Jones-Redmond
 | ceeb                    = 142547
 | principal               = Mr. Jake Gourley 
 | staff                   = 
 | faculty                 = 165
 | teaching_staff          = 
 | grades                  = 9–12
 | gender                  = Coed
 | grade9                  = 473 students
 | grade10                 = 433 students
 | grade11                 = 487 students
 | grade12                 = 447 students
 | avg_class_size          = 24.2
 | slogan                  = 
 | song                    = 
 | fightsong               = 
 | conference              = South Suburban Conference
 | mascot                  = 
 | team_name               = Red Wolves
 | rival                   = Thornton Fractional North High School
 | accreditation           = North Central Association of Colleges and Schools
 | ACT                     = 18.0
 | publication             = Rebel Ana
 | newspaper               = Rebel Rouser"
 | yearbook                = Postscript | nobel_laureates         = 
 | picture                 = 
 | campus size             = 
 | campus type             = Suburban
 | mascot image            = 
 | colors                  =  Red Gray
 | enrollment              = 1,840 (2020-21)
 | free_label              = 
 | free_text               = 
 | free_label1             = 
 | free_text1              = 
 | free_label2             = 
 | free_text2              = 
 | free_label3             = 
 | free_text3              = 
 | free_label4             = 
 | free_text4              = 
 | free_label5             = 
 | free_text5              = 
 | homepage                = http://TFD215.org/South/
}}

Foundation
Thornton Fractional South High School opened in 1958 and Thornton Fractional High School in Calumet City, which opened in 1926, was renamed to Thornton Fractional North High School. The school flag, a replica of the flag of the Confederacy of the United States, was retired in 1993. The Thornton Fractional Vocational Center, later renamed the Center for Academics and Technology was later built between the two high schools in Calumet City and opened for T.F. South and T.F. North students and has served many purposes, from being a freshman academy, to hosting AP courses for students from both campuses, to housing programs such as CAD, nursing, and culinary arts.

Academics
In 2010, District 215, T.F. South, T.F. North, and CAT, combined had an average composite ACT score of 18.7. Also in 2010, the total enrollment at T.F. South was 2,014 and graduated 93% of its senior class.  T.F. South has not made Adequate Yearly Progress (AYP) on the Prairie State Achievement Examination, PSAE, a state test used in Illinois to fulfill the mandates of the federal No Child Left Behind Act.  When comparing District 215's 2008–2009's PSAE scores to 2009–2010's scores, the scores have significantly gone down. Overall, the school has not met minimum expectations in mathematics and science. All three of the school's student subgroups failed to meet expectations in mathematics, and two of the three failed to meet expectations in reading.

Athletics/Activities
T.F. South competes as a member of the South Suburban Conference. The school is a member of the Illinois High School Association (IHSA), which governs most athletics and competitive activities in Illinois. Teams are known as the Red Wolves .The Athletics Director is Marc Brewe.

The school sponsors interscholastic teams in Badminton, Baseball, Basketball, Bowling, Cheerleading, Cross Country, Dance, Football, Golf, Soccer, Softball, Swimming, Tennis, Track and Field, Volleyball, and Wrestling.

The following athletic/activity teams have placed top 4 in their respective IHSA sponsored state tournament:

 Badminton (Girls): State Champions (2012-13, 2013-14); 2nd Place (2010-11)
 Bowling (Girls): State Champions (1989-90)
 Drama: State Champion (2002-03); 2nd Place (1991-92, 2000-01, 2008-09); 3rd Place (1960-61, 1971-72, 1986-87)
 Football: 2nd Place (1994–95, 2002–03)
 Group Interpretation: State Champions (1989-90, 1997-98, 1998-99, 2000-01, 2001-02); 2nd Place (1982-83); 3rd Place (1975-76, 1985-86, 2002-03)
 Speech (Team): State Champions (1960-61); 2nd Place (1962-63)

 Notable alumni 

 Curtis Granderson - Major League Baseball player

 Bruce Kingma - economist, professor, and former provost for entrepreneurship at Syracuse University; graduated from TFS in 1979
 Demetra Plakas - drummer for all-girl punk band L7 (band), graduated in 1982
 Harry Smith - television journalist, best known for CBS's The Early Show and hosting A&E program Biography (1997–2002), currently with NBC
 Pierre Thomas - NFL player, New Orleans Saints
 Tom Baldwin - NFL player, New York Jets
 Ken Kremer - NFL player, Kansas City Chiefs
 Jim O'Heir - actor best known for portraying Jerry Gergich in the television sitcom Parks and Recreation''

References

External links
 Official website

Educational institutions established in 1957
Lansing, Illinois
Public high schools in Cook County, Illinois
1957 establishments in Illinois